Athletics at the 1992 Summer Paralympics consisted of 239 events, 152 for men and 62 for women. Because of a tie in the first position of the men's 100m in class B1 and another tie also happened in the third place of the high jump event in the b2 class for men. 240 gold medals, 238 silver and 240 bronze were awarded.

Swimming, athletics and table tennis used a medical based classification system for the Barcelona Games.  This happened as the Games were in a transition period with a number of other sports starting to move to a fully functional based classification system.

This medal table includes also the 1992 Paralympic Games for Persons with mental handicap, which held by the same organizing committee, and is part of same event, but in Madrid, between 15 and 22 September in the same year.

Participating nations

Medal summary

Medal table

Men's events

Women's events

Madrid Medal Summary

Men's events

Women's events

References 

 

 
1992 Summer Paralympics events
1992
Paralympics